Pink Media BH is a Serbian cable television channel based in Belgrade and tailored for viewers in Bosnia and Herzegovina. It was established on 3 September 2018 when Pink Media Group sold its terrestrial commercial channels "Pink BH" (now Nova BH) and "Pink M" (now Nova M) to The United Group.

Programming
Pink Media BH channel lineup consists of programmes from Pink's terrestrial channel RTV Pink or Pink World intended to linear broadcasting or re-broadcasting on the Bosnian market. By concept and name, a similar tv channel called Pink Media also exists in Serbia and is intended for public in neighboring Montenegro.

News
 Minut 2 - daily news bulletin, every full hour - duration 2 minutes with an overview of the most important news for and from Bosnia and Herzegovina.

Entertainment
 Zadruga 2 - reality TV show 
 Zadruga Pregled dana - reality show
 Zadruga Izbacivanje - reality show
 Zadruga Uživo - reality show
 Pinkove Zvezdice - music singing contest for kids
 Pinkove Zvezde - music singing contest for adults
 Bravo Show - music show
 Ami G Show - talk show hosted by Ognjen Amidžić
 Premijera - tv magazine about celebrities 
 Ekskluzivno - tv magazine about celebrities 
  - tv magazine about celebrities 
 Akademija debelih - reality show
 Kuvanje i muvanje - cooking show
 Prvi kuvar Srbije - reality cooking show
 Kuća od srca - TV show of humanitarian character
 Izvedi me - Take Me Out

Series, Telenovelas
September 2018:

References

External links

Television stations in Serbia
Television stations in Bosnia and Herzegovina
Television channels and stations established in 2018